"Mi Mi Mi" is a song by Russian girl group Serebro from their third studio album Sila tryokh. It was released on 14 June 2013 in Russia as a digital download, while an accompanying music video premiered on 10 June 2013. Although not a commercial success worldwide, only peaking at number 11 in Italy, the song slowly gained popularity for its catchiness and summer atmosphere. The song is played in many clubs worldwide, as well as in movies and television shows, especially in South Korea.

Charts

Weekly charts

Year-end charts

Controversy 
In 2018, Serebro accused K-pop girl group Momoland of plagiarizing "Mi Mi Mi" with their song "Bboom Bboom". Shinsadong Tiger, the song's producer, denied the allegations, saying "the bass line [is] commonly heard in retro house or electro swing genres, as well as the 4-stanza chord."

In popular culture 

The song is used in the film Spy being played in the club, as Cooper finds out that Lia (the woman who tricked Ford in Paris) is the one making the offer for the bomb.
The song is also played on various television shows in South Korea. Some of the most popular are Exo Showtime, EXID Showtime and Running Man. This has helped the song to become a long-running hit in that country, staying in the Gaon International Chart over one year and a half since its release.
Shae's song "Aku Suka Kamu" adapted the song and used the tune of the song. Among other changes in the sung melody, the first interval of the chorus is changed from a semitone to two semitones in the vocals, while the saxophone backing still uses the same melody as the original.
The song is used in the 2015 film Jem and the Holograms, when Jerrica, Kimber, Aja and Shana get makeovers from Starlight productions after arriving in LA.
The song was covered in Japanese by J-pop group MAX in 2015.
The song is featured in the dance rhythm game Just Dance 2019, covered by Hit the Electro Beat.

References

2013 songs
Serebro songs
Songs written by Maxim Fadeev
Songs written by Olga Seryabkina
2013 singles
Casablanca Records singles
Bubblegum pop songs
Electro swing songs
Songs with feminist themes
English-language Russian songs